Project Nim is a 2011 documentary film directed by James Marsh.

Summary
It focuses on Project Nim, a research project that was mounted in the 1970s to determine whether a primate raised in close contact with humans could develop a limited "language" based on American Sign Language. The project was centred on a chimpanzee named Nim Chimpsky.

Release
The film was first publicly shown during the 2011 Sundance Film Festival, and then released for public exhibition on 8 July 2011.

Controversy
In 2019, Herbert S. Terrace, who led the research on Nim, published the book Why Chimpanzees Can’t Learn Language and Only Humans Can. There, he explained how he perceived the documentary Project Nim as "mainly an ad hominem attack" on himself. Terrace stated that the allegation that he had returned Nim to the primate colony as punishment for his failing to learn sign language is untrue. Besides, Terrace criticised how the documentary represented a "complete failure to present the scientific background of the work" done and "its theoretical significance."

Reception and awards
Project Nim was released to critical acclaim. The film has received an aggregated score of 97% from 147 reviews on Rotten Tomatoes, with an average rank of 8.1/10. The sites consensus reads "Equal parts hilarious, poignant, and heartbreaking, Project Nim not only tells a compelling story masterfully, but also raises the flag on the darker side of human nature". On Metacritic, the film has a score of 83 out of a 100 based on 33 critics, indicating "universal acclaim".

David Rooney of The Hollywood Reporter praised the film for its "haunting life story" which according to him shows "an exquisite example of non-fiction filmmaking" that can develop into "[a] full-bodied, emotionally complex drama".

Marjorie Baumgarten of The Austin Chronicle was of a different view, as she wrote that "there is no question Nim was exploited for human gain, yet there are important aspects which Marsh leaves unexplored".

The film has won 15 and was nominated for 27 awards, including Best Documentary at the 65th British Academy Film Awards.

Home media
The DVD was released on 7 February 2012 by Lionsgate Home Entertainment.

References

External links

Project Nim at Red Box Films

2011 documentary films
2011 films
Documentary films about animal rights
British documentary films
Roadside Attractions films
Films about apes
American documentary films
2010s English-language films
2010s American films
2010s British films
English-language documentary films